Louis De Fontenay. Bartlett (1873–1951) was an attorney and Mayor of Berkeley, California, from 1919 to 1923.

Bartlett was noted for his work to promote public utilities, especially water and power.

Louis Bartlett was born in San Francisco on September 20, 1872, the son of Columbus Bartlett and Louise Mel de Fontenay.  He was married June 13, 1903, to Mary Olney, daughter of Warren Olney and Mary Craven.  The Bartletts had three daughters: Mary, Muriel, and Ruth.  Bartlett died February 4, 1951, in San Francisco.  Mary Olney died in 1948.  Louis  married Natalie Varty May 10, 1957.

References

External links
 Louis Bartlett Papers, Water Resources Collections and Archives, University of California, Riverside

Bartlett, Louis A.
1951 deaths
1872 births
Lawyers from Berkeley, California
20th-century American politicians
People from San Francisco